Alberico is both a masculine Italian given name and a surname. Notable people with the name include:

Given name
Alberico Albricci (1864–1936), Italian general
Alberico Archinto (1698–1758), Italian cardinal and papal diplomat
Alberico Di Cecco (born 1974), Italian long-distance runner
Alberico Gentili (1552–1608), Italian lawyer and jurist
Alberico Passadore (born 1960), Uruguayan rugby union player
Alberico da Barbiano (c. 1344–1409), Italian condottiero
Alberico da Romano (1196–1260), Italian condottiero, troubadour and statesman

Surname
Neil Alberico (born 1992), American racing driver

Italian masculine given names